Dimitrios Tsapalos (born 13 October 1993) is a Greek professional footballer who plays as a goalkeeper for English club Morpeth Town.

References

1993 births
Living people
Greek footballers
Greek expatriate footballers
Football League (Greece) players
Gamma Ethniki players
Northern Premier League players
Panetolikos F.C. players
Panegialios F.C. players
Morpeth Town A.F.C. players
Association football goalkeepers
Footballers from Patras